Mythily Ramaswamy (born 6 June 1954) is an Indian mathematician and professor in the Department of Mathematics at the TIFR Centre for Applicable Mathematics of the Tata Institute of Fundamental Research in Bangalore. Her research involves functional analysis and controllability of partial differential equations.

Education
Ramaswamy was born near Mumbai, to a banking family, but moved often to other parts of India as a child.
She obtained her doctorate in 1990 from Pierre and Marie Curie University in Paris. Her dissertation, Sur des questions de symetrie dans des problemes elliptiques [On questions of symmetry in elliptic problems] was supervised by Henri Berestycki.

Recognition
Ramaswamy was the 2004 winner of the Kalpana Chawla Award of the Karnataka State Council for Science and Technology, "given to a young woman scientist for achievements in the field of science and technology".
She was elected to the Indian Academy of Sciences in 2007. She became a Fulbright Scholar for 2016–2017, funding her to visit Michael Renardy at Virginia Tech.

References 

1954 births
Living people
Indian mathematicians
Women mathematicians
Control theorists
Mathematical analysts
Pierre and Marie Curie University alumni
Academic staff of Tata Institute of Fundamental Research